Hikaru Kojima (born 25 May 1994) is a Japanese professional footballer who plays as a midfielder for WE League club Omiya Ardija Ventus.

Club career 
Kojima made her WE League debut on 10 October 2021.

References 

Living people
1994 births
Japanese women's footballers
Women's association football midfielders
Omiya Ardija Ventus players
WE League players
Association football people from Tokyo